We is a dystopian novel by Russian writer Yevgeny Zamyatin, written 1920–1921. It was first published as an English translation by Gregory Zilboorg in 1924 by E. P. Dutton in New York, with the original Russian text first published in 1952. The novel describes a world of harmony and conformity within a united totalitarian state. It influenced the emergence of dystopia as a literary genre. George Orwell said that Aldous Huxley's 1931 Brave New World must be partly derived from We, although Huxley denied this.

Setting 
We is set in the future. D-503, a spacecraft engineer, lives in the One State, an urban nation constructed almost entirely of glass, which assists mass surveillance. The structure of the state is Panopticon-like, and life is scientifically managed F. W. Taylor-like. People march in step with each other and are uniformed. There is no way of referring to people except by their given numbers. The society is run strictly by logic or reason as the primary justification for the laws or the construct of the society. The individual's behaviour is based on logic by way of formulae and equations outlined by the One State.

Plot 
A few hundred years after the One State's conquest of the entire world, the spaceship Integral is being built in order to invade and conquer extraterrestrial planets. Meanwhile, the project's chief engineer, D-503, begins a journal that he intends to be carried upon the completed spaceship.

Like all other citizens of the One State, D-503 lives in a glass apartment building and is carefully watched by the secret police, or Bureau of Guardians. D-503's lover, O-90, has been assigned by One State to visit him on certain nights. She is considered too short to bear children and is deeply grieved by her state in life. O-90's other lover and D-503's best friend is R-13, a State poet who reads his verse at public executions.

While on an assigned walk with O-90, D-503 meets a woman named I-330. I-330 smokes cigarettes, drinks alcohol, and shamelessly flirts with D-503 instead of applying for an impersonal sex visit; all of these are highly illegal according to the laws of the One State.

Both repelled and fascinated, D-503 struggles to overcome his attraction to I-330. She invites him to visit the Ancient House, notable for being the only opaque building in the One State, except for windows. Objects of aesthetic and historical importance dug up from around the city are stored there. There, I-330 offers him the services of a corrupt doctor to explain his absence from work. Leaving in horror, D-503 vows to denounce her to the Bureau of Guardians, but finds that he cannot.

He begins to have dreams, which disturbs him, as dreams are thought to be a symptom of mental illness. Slowly, I-330 reveals to D-503 that she is involved with the Mephi, an organization plotting to bring down the One State. She takes him through secret tunnels inside the Ancient House to the world outside the Green Wall, which surrounds the city-state. There, D-503 meets the inhabitants of the outside world: humans whose bodies are covered with animal fur. The aims of the Mephi are to destroy the Green Wall and reunite the citizens of the One State with the outside world.

Despite the recent rift between them, O-90 pleads with D-503 to impregnate her illegally. After O-90 insists that she will obey the law by turning over their child to be raised by the One State, D-503 obliges. However, as her pregnancy progresses, O-90 realizes that she cannot bear to be parted from her baby under any circumstances. At D-503's request, I-330 arranges for O-90 to be smuggled outside the Green Wall.

In his last journal entry, D-503 indifferently relates that he has been forcibly tied to a table and subjected to the "Great Operation", which has recently been mandated for all citizens of the One State in order to prevent possible riots; having been psycho-surgically refashioned into a state of mechanical "reliability", they would now function as "tractors in human form". This operation removes the imagination and emotions by targeting parts of the brain with X-rays. After this operation, D-503 willingly informed the Benefactor about the inner workings of the Mephi. However, D-503 expresses surprise that even torture could not induce I-330 to denounce her comrades. Despite her refusal, I-330 and those arrested with her have been sentenced to death, "under the Benefactor's Machine".

Meanwhile, the Mephi uprising gathers strength; parts of the Green Wall have been destroyed, birds are repopulating the city, and people start committing acts of social rebellion. Although D-503 expresses hope that the Benefactor shall restore "reason", the novel ends with the One State's survival in doubt. I-330's mantra is that, just as there is no highest number, there can be no final revolution.

Major themes

Dystopian society 

The dystopian society depicted in We is presided over by the Benefactor and is surrounded by a giant Green Wall to separate the citizens from primitive untamed nature.  All citizens are known as "numbers". Every hour in one's life is directed by "The Table".

The action of We is set at some time after the Two Hundred Years' War, which has wiped out all but "0.2 percent of the earth's population". The war was over a rare substance only mentioned in the book through a metaphor; the substance was called "bread" as the "Christians gladiated over it"—as in Christians killed for sport in Roman gladiator games as a form of entertainment, "bread and circuses," suggesting a war that was meant to distract the population from a power grab by the government. The war only ended after the use of weapons of mass destruction, so that the One State is surrounded with a post-apocalyptic landscape.

Allusions and references
Many of the names and numbers in We are allusions to personal experiences of Zamyatin or to culture and literature.
For example, "Auditorium 112" refers to cell number 112, where Zamyatin was twice imprisoned, and the name of S-4711 is a reference to the Eau de Cologne number 4711.

Zamyatin, who worked as a naval architect, refers to the specifications of the icebreaker St. Alexander Nevsky.
The numbers [.. .] of the chief characters in WE are taken directly from the specifications of Zamyatin's favourite icebreaker, the Saint Alexander Nevsky, yard no. A/W 905, round tonnage 3300, where O–90 and I-330 appropriately divide the hapless D-503 [.. .] Yu-10 could easily derive from the Swan Hunter yard numbers of no fewer than three of Zamyatin's major icebreakers – 1012, 1020, 1021 [.. .]. R-13 can be found here too, as well as in the yard number of Sviatogor A/W 904."All these icebreakers were constructed in England, in Newcastle and yards nearby; there are traces of my work in every one of them, especially the Alexander Nevsky—now the Lenin; I did the preliminary design, and after that none of the vessel's drawings arrived in the workshop without having been checked and signed:

'Chief surveyor of Russian Icebreakers' Building E.Zamiatin." [The signature is written in English.] (Zamyatin ([1962]))

Many comparisons to The Bible exist in We.  There are similarities between Genesis Chapters 1–4 and We, where the One State is considered Paradise, D-503 is Adam, and I-330 is Eve.  The snake in this piece is S-4711, who is described as having a bent and twisted form, with a "double-curved body" (he is a double agent). References to Mephistopheles (in the Mephi) are seen as allusions to Satan and his rebellion against Heaven in the Bible (Ezekiel 28:11–19; Isaiah 14:12–15).  The novel itself could be considered a criticism of organised religion given this interpretation. However, Zamyatin, influenced by Fyodor Dostoyevsky's Notes from Underground and The Brothers Karamazov, made the novel a criticism of the excesses of a militantly atheistic society. The novel displayed an indebtedness to H. G. Wells's dystopia When the Sleeper Wakes (1899).

The novel uses mathematical concepts symbolically. The spaceship that D-503 is supervising the construction of is called the Integral, which he hopes will "integrate the grandiose cosmic equation". D-503 also mentions that he is profoundly disturbed by the concept of the square root of −1—which is the basis for imaginary numbers (imagination being deprecated by the One State). Zamyatin's point, probably in light of the increasingly dogmatic Soviet government of the time, would seem to be that it is impossible to remove all the rebels against a system. Zamyatin even says this through I-330: "There is no final revolution. Revolutions are infinite."

Literary significance and influences 
Along with Jack London's The Iron Heel, We is generally considered to be the grandfather of the satirical futuristic dystopia genre. It takes the modern industrial society to an extreme conclusion, depicting a state that believes that free will is the cause of unhappiness, and that citizens' lives should be controlled with mathematical precision based on the system of industrial efficiency created by Frederick Winslow Taylor. The Soviet attempt at implementing Taylorism, led by Aleksei Gastev, may have immediately influenced Zamyatin's portrayal of the One State. In Russia, a dystopian totalitarian society before Zamyatin was described by Mikhail Saltykov in his satirical novel The History of a Town, and Saltykov's idea of "Utopia of the straight line" continues in We: "To unbend the wild curve, to straighten it out to a tangent — to a straight line!"

Christopher Collins in Evgenij Zamjatin: An Interpretive Study finds the many intriguing literary aspects of We more interesting and relevant today than the political aspects:

 An examination of myth and symbol reveals that the work may be better understood as an internal drama of a conflicted modern man rather than as a representation of external reality in a failed utopia. The city is laid out as a mandala, populated with archetypes and subject to an archetypal conflict. One wonders if Zamyatin were familiar with the theories of his contemporary C. G. Jung or whether it is a case here of the common European zeitgeist.
 Much of the cityscape and expressed ideas in the world of We are taken almost directly from the works of H. G. Wells, a popular apostle of scientific socialist utopia whose works Zamyatin had edited in Russian.
 In the use of color and other imagery Zamyatin shows he was influenced by Kandinsky and other European Expressionist painters.

The little-known Russian dystopian novel Love in the Fog of the Future, published in 1924 by Andrei Marsov, has also been compared to We.

George Orwell claimed that Aldous Huxley's Brave New World (1932) must be partly derived from We. However, in a letter to Christopher Collins in 1962, Huxley says that he wrote Brave New World as a reaction to H. G. Wells's utopias long before he had heard of We.

Kurt Vonnegut said that in writing Player Piano (1952), he "cheerfully ripped off the plot of Brave New World, whose plot had been cheerfully ripped off from Yevgeny Zamyatin's We". Ayn Rand's Anthem (1938) has many significant similarities to We (detailed here), although it is stylistically and thematically different. Vladimir Nabokov's novel Invitation to a Beheading may suggest a dystopian society with some similarities to Zamyatin's; Nabokov read We while writing Invitation to a Beheading.

Orwell began Nineteen Eighty-Four (1949) some eight months after he read We in a French translation and wrote a review of it. Orwell is reported as "saying that he was taking it as the model for his next novel". Brown writes that for Orwell and certain others, We "appears to have been the crucial literary experience". Shane states that "Zamyatin's influence on Orwell is beyond dispute". Robert Russell, in an overview of the criticism of We, concludes that "1984 shares so many features with We that there can be no doubt about its general debt to it"; but that there is a minority of critics who view the similarities between We and Nineteen Eighty-Four as "entirely superficial". Further, Russell finds that "Orwell's novel is both bleaker and more topical than Zamyatin's, lacking entirely that ironic humour that pervades the Russian work".

In The Right Stuff (1979), Tom Wolfe describes We as a "marvelously morose novel of the future" featuring an "omnipotent spaceship" called the Integral whose "designer is known only as 'D-503, Builder of the Integral'". Wolfe goes on to use the Integral as a metaphor for the Soviet launch vehicle, the Soviet space programme, or the Soviet Union.

Jerome K. Jerome has been cited as an influence on Zamyatin's novel. Jerome's short story The New Utopia (1891) describes a regimented future city, indeed world, of nightmarish egalitarianism, where men and women are barely distinguishable in their grey uniforms (Zamyatin's "unifs") and all have short black hair, natural or dyed. No one has a name: women wear even numbers on their tunics, and men wear odd, just as in We. Equality is taken to such lengths that people with well-developed physiques are liable to have lopped limbs. In Zamyatin, similarly, the equalisation of noses is earnestly proposed. Jerome has anyone with an overactive imagination subjected to a levelling-down operation—something of central importance in We. There is a shared depiction by both Jerome and Zamyatin that individual and, by extension, familial love is a disruptive and humanizing force.  Jerome's works were translated in Russia three times before 1917. Jerome's Three Men in a Boat is a set book in Russian schools.

In 1998, the first English translation of Cursed Days, a diary kept in secret by anti-communist Russian author Ivan Bunin during the Russian Civil War in Moscow and Odessa was published in Chicago. In a foreword, the diary's English translator, Thomas Gaiton Marullo, described Cursed Days as a rare example of dystopian nonfiction and pointed out multiple parallels between the secret diary kept by Bunin and the diary kept by D-503.

Publication history 

Zamyatin's literary position deteriorated throughout the 1920s, and he was eventually allowed to emigrate to Paris in 1931, probably after the intercession of Maxim Gorky.

The novel was first published in English in 1924 by E. P. Dutton in New York in a translation by Gregory Zilboorg, but its first publication in the Soviet Union had to wait until 1988, when glasnost resulted in it appearing alongside George Orwell's Nineteen Eighty-Four. A year later, We and Brave New World were published together in a combined edition.

In 1994, the novel received a Prometheus Award in the "Hall of Fame" category.

Russian-language editions 

  (bibrec) (bibrec )
 The first complete Russian-language edition of We was published in New York in 1952. (Brown, p. xiv, xxx)
 
  (bibrec) (bibrec )
 We was first published in the USSR in this collection of Zamyatin's works. (Brown, p. xiv, xxx)
  (also cited as Zamyatin: We, Duckworth, 2006) 
 Edited with Introduction and Notes by Andrew Barratt. Plain Russian text, with English introduction, bibliography and notes.

Translations to English 

  
 
 
 
 
 
 
  (preview)
  (author photo on cover)

Translations to other languages 

 
 

 Zamiatin, Yevgueni (1970). Nosotros. Juan Benusiglio Berndt (trans.). Barcelona: Plaza & Janés.

Zamiatine, Evgueni (2017). Nous (in French). Hélène Henry (trans.). Arles (France): Actes Sud. .

Adaptations

Films 

The German TV network ZDF adapted the novel for a TV movie in 1982, under the German title Wir (English: We).

The novel has also been adapted, by Alain Bourret, a French director, into a short film called The Glass Fortress (2016). The Glass Fortress is an experimental film that employs a technique known as still image film, and is shot in black-and-white, which help support the grim atmosphere of the story's dystopian society. The film is technically similar to La Jetée (1962), directed by Chris Marker, and refers somewhat to THX 1138 (1971), by George Lucas, in the "religious appearance of the Well Doer". According to film critic Isabelle Arnaud, The Glass Fortress has a special atmosphere underlining a story of thwarted love that will be long remembered.

A Russian film adaptation, directed by Hamlet Dulyan and starring Egor Koreshkov, is in post-production as of May 2021, with a projected release sometime in the fall.

Theatre 
Montreal company Théâtre Deuxième Réalité produced an adaptation of the novel in 1996, adapted and directed by Alexandre Marine, under the title Nous Autres.

Music 
Released in 2015, The Glass Fortress is a musical and narrative adaptation of the novel by Rémi Orts Project and Alan B.

In 2022, the Canadian indie rock band Arcade Fire released We, an album whose title was inspired by the novel.

Legacy
We, the 1921 Russian novel, directly inspired:
 Aldous Huxley Brave New World (1932) (Disputed by Huxley, see above.)
Vladimir Nabokov's Invitation to a Beheading (1935–1936)
 Ayn Rand Anthem (1938) 
 George Orwell Nineteen Eighty-Four (1949) 
 Kurt Vonnegut Player Piano (1952)
 William F. Nolan & George Clayton Johnson Logan's Run (1967)
 Ira Levin This Perfect Day (1970)
 Ursula K. Le Guin The Dispossessed (1974)

See also 
 Cursed Days by Ivan Bunin

Notes

References

Reviews 

 Sally Feller, Your Daily Dystopian History Lesson From Yevgeny Zamyatin: A Review of We

Books

Journal articles 

 
 
 
 
 
 
  
  (updates articles by Myers published in The Slavonic and East European Review)
 
 
 
 
 English: My wives, icebreakers and Russia. Russian: О моих женах, о ледоколах и о России.
 The original date and location of publication are unknown, although he mentions the 1928 rescue of the Nobile expedition by the Krasin, the renamed Svyatogor.
 The article is reprinted in E. I. Zamiatin, 'O moikh zhenakh, o ledokolakh i o Rossii', Sochineniia (Munich, 1970–1988, four vols.) II, pp. 234–40.

External links 

  (1924 Zilboorg translation, in English) (1924 Zilboorg translation, in English)
 We - full text 
 We - full text  (1924 Zilboorg translation, in English)
 
 Film - 

1924 Russian novels
1924 science fiction novels
Book censorship in the Soviet Union
Censored books
Cosmism
Dystopian novels
Fiction with unreliable narrators
Fictional astronauts
Novels about totalitarianism
Novels by Yevgeny Zamyatin
Russian magic realism novels
Russian novels adapted into films
Russian novels adapted into television shows
Russian philosophical novels
Russian science fiction novels
Science fiction novels adapted into films
Soviet novels
Soviet science fiction novels